is the seventh studio album by Japanese idol duo Wink, released by Polystar on November 25, 1991. It features the single "Haitoku no Scenario". Also included in the album are Japanese-language covers of Kylie Minogue's "Step Back in Time", Cathy Dennis' "Touch Me (All Night Long)", and Bobby Freeman's "Do You Want to Dance".

The album peaked at No. 7 on Oricon's albums chart and sold over 63,000 copies.

Track listing 
All music is arranged by Satoshi Kadokura.

Charts

References

External links 
 
 
 

1991 albums
Wink (duo) albums
Japanese-language albums